The Carlos Palanca Memorial Awards for Literature winners in 1962 (rank, title of winning entry, name of author).


English division
Short story
 First prize: "The Mountain" by Jose V. Ayala
 Second prize: "Journey to the Edge of the Sea" by Gregorio Brillantes
 Third prize: "Rice Wine" by Wilfrido D. Nolledo

One-act play
 First prize: "With Patches of Many Hues" by Estrella D. Alfon
 Second prize: Human Interest" by A. Oliver Flores
 Third prize: "The Fly-Trap" by Mar V. Puatu

Filipino (Tagalog) division
Short story in Filipino
 First prize: "Banyaga" by Liwayway Arceo
 Second prize: "Impeng Negro" by Rogelio R. Sikat
 Third prize: "Sugat sa Dibdib ng Gabi" by Buenaventura S. Medina Jr.

One-act play in Filipino
 First prize: "May Iba Pang Daigdig" by Gregorio A. Moral Jr.
 Second prize: "Ang Huling Ulos" by Benjamin P. Pascual
 Third prize: "Madilim sa Entresuwelo" by Gregorio R. Florencio Jr.

More winners by year

References
 

1962
1962 literary awards